The .350 Remington Magnum was introduced in 1965 by Remington Arms Company for the Model 600 rifle.  It was later offered in the Model 660 and Model 700 rifles (one of various cartridge offerings) but was discontinued as a regular factory chambering in 1974 after a poor sales record.  Remington has also offered the Model Seven MS from their Custom Shop and a limited edition 700 Classic in recent years chambered in .350 Remington Magnum. Remington began chambering the round in the new Model 673 Guide Rifle in 2002. This caliber was also sold as a chambered size configuration in a line of long range shooting and competition handguns,  the Remington XP-100.

History
At the time of its introduction the .350 Remington had a short, fat case, similar to the current crop of short magnums except that the .350 carries a belt. Its closest competitor, the .35 Whelen was still just a wildcat from a necked-up .30-06, so the .350 Rem was the most powerful .35 caliber around, and in a short cartridge that allowed the use in compact quick-handling rifles. However, gun writers and shooters of the time were not yet enamored of the short-fat concept as they are today, and they preferred the older longer .35 Whelen based on the .30-06 cartridge, even though it had, at best, similar performance in short barrels. Today the .350 Rem has had some improvement in acceptance, due to the shorter cartridge being able to fit in a .308 length action.

Though the cartridge has great merit, it has never attained tremendous popularity.  This is due in no small part to the rather vicious recoil produced when firing the cartridge from the lightweight Model 600 it was initially chambered in.  The Model 673 and Model 7 so chambered are a full pound heavier at 7.5 lbs, and do better to mitigate recoil.  Still, with the .30-06 Springfield being toward the upper end of what many shooters find tolerable in a 7-8 pound sporting rifle, the .350 Remington Magnum remains a bit of a niche cartridge with a small but dedicated following.

Maximum pressure for the .350 Remington is set at 53,000 CUP by SAAMI.

Use

The .350 Remington Magnum is a fairly powerful cartridge, but the magazine length of the rifles it is usually chambered in, does limit its ability to use longer, heavier bullets with higher ballistic coefficients.  Still, with certain bullets and handloading, it is a capable 500+ yard big game cartridge.  Its premier use, though, is more as a "brush gun", basically defined as a short, handy rifle that is more easily maneuvered in environments where shots are likely to be closer, and opportunities appear and disappear quickly.  At reasonable ranges, the .350 Remington Magnum is capable of taking any game on the North American continent effectively and humanely.  It would also be suitable for many African species, though some African nations have a .375" (9.53mm) or .400" (10.2mm) minimum caliber requirement for dangerous game.

Comparison
The .350 Rem. Mag. offers ballistics equal to the .35 Whelen in a shorter cartridge and from a shorter barrel, hence more compact rifles. With barrels of equal length, the .350 Rem surpasses the Whelen.

See also

 .35 Whelen
 .358 Winchester
 List of rifle cartridges
 9 mm caliber other cartridges of similar size.
 Table of handgun and rifle cartridges

References

 Return of the .350 Remington Magnum in Rifler Shooter Magazine

External links
 The .350 Remington Magnum by Chuck Hawks
 Compared: the .35 Whelen and .350 Rem Mag by Chuck Hawks
 Compared: The .350 Rem Mag and .450 Marlin by Chuck Hawks

Pistol and rifle cartridges
Remington Magnum rifle cartridges